The 1974-75 American Basketball Association season saw the Spirits of St. Louis, led by Marvin Barnes, Maurice Lucas, Gus Gerard and coach Bob MacKinnon, finish third in the ABA Eastern Division and defeat the New York Nets in the 1975 ABA Semifinals before losing in the Eastern Division Finals to the eventual ABA champion Kentucky Colonels.

Offseason

Draft picks 
The Spirits drafted John Lucas (who stayed in college), Gus Gerard and Mickey Johnson (who signed with the Chicago Bulls of the NBA), and in a special draft of NBA players selected Pete Maravich, Henry Bibby, Phil Jackson, Paul Westphal and Jeff Mullins, all of whom stayed in the NBA.

Preseason transactions
Following the 1973-74 season the Carolina Cougars were purchased for $1.5 million by new owners including Ozzie Silna, Daniel Silna, Harry Weltman, Donald Schupak and Donald Schupak.  The new owners moved the team to St. Louis and began play as the Spirits of St. Louis.  Rudy Martzke was named Director of Operations.

In May 1974 the Spirits sold Teddy McClain to the Kentucky Colonels.

On May 10, 1974, the Spirits released Jim Chones.  On June 20, 1974, the Spirits sold Mack Calvin to the Denver Nuggets, and that same month Billy Cunningham left the team to return to the NBA.  On July 17, 1974, the Spirits signed Marvin Barnes, who had been drafted by the Denver Nuggets, to a seven-year, $2.1 million contract; the ABA awarded Denver an additional 1975 first-round draft choice as compensation.  On September 27, 1974, the Spirits signed Don Chaney of the Boston Celtics to a three-year, $600,000 contract to begin with the 1975-76 season.  Also in September 1974 the Spirits signed Maurice Lucas to a six-year contract.

Bob McKinnon became the Spirits' coach prior to the season, replacing Larry Brown who left for the Denver Nuggets along with Carl Scheer.

In September 1974 Bob Costas was hired as the Spirits' radio announcer.

Preseason exhibition games
Unlike most ABA teams, the Spirits did not play preseason exhibition games against NBA opponents prior to the 1974-75 season, though they did before the 1975-76 season, and in prior seasons as the Carolina Cougars.

Regular season

Roster
24   Marvin Barnes
34  Mike Barr
27  Joe Caldwell
7  Terry Driscoll
15  Jimmy Foster
12  Bernie Fryer
11  Gus Gerard
42  Tom Ingelsby
22  Steve Jones
55  Goo Kennedy
1  Freddie Lewis
20  Maurice Lucas
14  Tom Owens
54  Gene Moore
35  Fly Williams
44  Dennis Wuycik
10  Don Adams

Season standings

Playoffs

The Kentucky Colonels finished the season as the Eastern Division champions, and dispatched the Memphis Sounds in the Eastern Division Semifinals, 4 games to 1.  The Spirits and Colonels met in the Eastern Division Semifinals.

Game 1 of the Eastern Division semifinals was played in Louisville on April 21.  Kentucky won 112-99 despite Freddie Lewis' 35 points.  Game 2 on April 23 saw the Colonels win at home 108-103 despite Marvin Barnes' 43 points.

The series then moved to St. Louis on April 25.  The Spirits had lagged in attendance all season but outdrew the Colonels' first two crowds in the series as 10,142 showed up for Game 3.  Freddie Lewis scored 32 points and St. Louis defeated Kentucky 103-97.  Game 4 saw Artis Gilmore lead all scorers with 33 as the Colonels beat the Spirits 117-98 before 11,688 fans on April 27.

The Spirits and Colonels met for Game 5 in Louisville on April 28.  Kentucky's crowd of 8,726 was less than either of the two St. Louis crowds, and Marvin Barnes scored 35 points for the Spirits.  Kentucky still won 123-103 and the Colonels advanced to the ABA Finals for the third time.

Player statistics

Legend

Season

Awards and records

Awards
 Marvin Barnes, 1975 ABA All-Star Game
 Marvin Barnes, 1975 ABA Rookie of the Year
 Marvin Barnes, Second Team All-ABA
 Marvin Barnes, 1975 ABA All-Rookie Team
 Gus Gerard, 1975 ABA All-Rookie Team
 Freddie Lewis, 1975 ABA All-Star Game
 Freddie Lewis, Most Valuable Player, 1975 ABA All-Star Game

Transactions

Draft and preseason signings
 May 1974: the Colonels purchased Ted McClain from the Spirits (still under the Carolina Cougars name)

References

External links
1974-75 Spirits of St. Louis on Basketball Reference
RememberTheABA.com 1974-75 regular season and playoff results
RememberTheABA.com Spirits of St. Louis page

Spirits of St. Louis
Spirits